Yadabad may refer to:
 Yadabad-e Olya
 Yadabad-e Sofla